The Volvo PV51 is a car introduced by Volvo in December 1936. It was replaced by the mildly restyled PV53 in 1938. This car remained in production until the end of the Second World War.

PV51-52 
The Volvo cars were quite expensive compared to their imported competitors. The PV51 was the answer to a request from Volvo’s dealers to offer a smaller and less expensive model. The rear end of the body was similar to the Carioca, but the front was new and the interior was simplified, to cut the price. The PV51 had to make do with a live front axle.

In early 1937 the de luxe model PV52 was introduced. The equipment list included twin sun visors, twin windscreen wipers, a watch, a heater and armrests on all four doors.

In March 1938 the PV51 Special and the PV52 Special were introduced. On these cars the spare wheel was moved from the bootlid to the boot floor. The cars had an expanded boot to increase the luggage space.

Versions 
 PV51: 1936-38, 1754 cars built, base model
 PV52: 1937-38, 1046 cars built, de luxe model
 PV51 ch: 1936-38, 205 cars built, commercial chassis

PV53-56 
In the autumn of 1938 the PV51-52 was replaced by the PV53-56. These cars had a new front end, modified suspension and steering, uprated interior and dashboard.

After the outbreak of the Second World War production continued, to provide transportation to the Swedish Armed Forces and other official functions. Most of these war time cars had a wood gas generator mounted on a trailer behind the car, since the engine had been converted to run on this domestic fuel.

Versions 
 PV53: 1938-45, 1204 cars built, base model
 PV54: 1938-45, 814 cars built, base model with larger boot
 PV55: 1938-45, 286 cars built, de luxe model
 PV56: 1938-45, 1321 cars built, de luxe model with larger boot
 PV57: 1938-45, 275 cars built, commercial chassis

Gallery

References
Volvo Personvagnar-från 20-tal till 80-tal by Björn-Eric Lindh, 1984.  
http://www.conceptcarz.com/vehicle/z6292/Volvo_PV%2052/default.aspx

Notes

External links 
Volvo Cars Heritage.
Volvo Museum.
Storvolvoklubben 

PV51
Rear-wheel-drive vehicles
Cars introduced in 1936
1930s cars
1940s cars